Haji Mohammad Nazar Faqiri (born 1955), or Nazar Muhammad Faqiri, was appointed to serve in the Meshrano Jirga, the upper house of Afghanistan`s national legislature, in 2005. He sits in the Meshrano Jirga as a direct appointment by Afghan President Hamid Karzai. Faqiri is from Baghlan Province, and is considered a tribal elder there.

He was born in 1955 in the village of Faqi in Pul-e-Khumri, Baghlan Province. and is a member of Afghanistan`s Tajik ethnic group. Faqiri completed high school prior to leaving Afghanistan as a war-time refugee in 1980. He went to live in Pakistan as a refugee in 1980, eventually serving as a director of two refugee camps.

An individual named Nazar Muhammad Faqiri was a candidate for the Wolesi Jirga in 2010, but failed to win a seat. Nevertheless the office of the Attorney General investigated whether he was involved in election irregularities.

References

Living people
1955 births
Afghan expatriates in Pakistan
Members of the House of Elders (Afghanistan)
Afghan refugees
Date of birth missing (living people)